Manguerra (mang-guerra) is the Hispanised version of the Mangubat surname from the combinations of the Filipino word "Mang" (i.e. to or to do) and the Spanish word "Guerra" (war). Manguerra therefore means "to wage war".

Surnames of Philippine origin